Holme St Cuthbert is a civil parish in the Borough of Allerdale in Cumbria, England.  It contains nine listed buildings that are recorded in the National Heritage List for England.  All the listed buildings are designated at Grade II, the lowest of the three grades, which is applied to "buildings of national importance and special interest".  The parish contains the villages and hamlets of Holme St Cuthbert, Edderside, Mawbray, Newtown, New Cowper, and Beckfoot, and the surrounding countryside.  The listed buildings consist of houses, farmhouses, farm buildings, and a chapel.


Buildings

References

Citations

Sources

Lists of listed buildings in Cumbria
Listed buildings